Charles Elmer Woodruff was an American reverend, educator and college football and college baseball coach. He served as the head football coach at Alma College in Alma, Michigan in 1896 and Iowa State College of Agriculture and Mechanic Arts—now known as Iowa State University—in Ames, Iowa in 1900. Woodruff was also the head baseball coach at Iowa State in 1901.

Education
Woodruff graduated from the University of Pennsylvania with a Bachelor of Arts in 1886 and was later a divinity student at the University of Chicago.

Coaching career

Alma
Woodruff was the head football coach at Alma College in Alma, Michigan for one season, in 1896, compiling a record of 2–0–1.

Iowa State
In 1900, Iowa State College hired Woodruff as a "director of physical culture and instructor in Latin." Woodruff served as the fifth head coach for the Iowa State football team during the 1900 season. His coaching record at Iowa state was 2–5–1.

Head coaching record

Football

References

Year of birth missing
Year of death missing
Alma Scots football coaches
Iowa State Cyclones athletic directors
Iowa State Cyclones baseball coaches
Iowa State Cyclones football coaches
Iowa State University faculty
University of Chicago Divinity School alumni
University of Pennsylvania alumni